The Earthworks Poster Collective  was an Australian artist collective that operated out of the Sydney University Art Workshop, more commonly known as the Tin Sheds, in the 1970s. The collective, based in Sydney, New South Wales, was active from 1972 to 1979.

History
The collective produced mainly screen-printed, political posters that sought to promote the rights of Aboriginal people, LGBT people, women, the unemployed and workers, including the posters for the exhibition The D'Oyley Show (1979) by the Women's Domestic Needlepoint Group. It also produced anti-nuclear, protest posters.

Earthworks Poster Collective disbanded in 1979, after failing to attract the funding needed to continue.

Today the Collective is regarded as having been the principal driving force in the early development of Australian political poster art during the 1970s. Works produced by the collective are held within the collections of The State Library of New South Wales, National Gallery of Australia, Queensland Art Gallery, the Powerhouse Museum, and the University of Sydney.

People
 Michael Callaghan
 Jan Mackay 
 Chips Mackinolty
 Marie McMahon
 Toni Robertson

See also
Australian poster collectives
Women's Domestic Needlework Group

References

External links
  State Library of New South Wales, First Ten Years of Sydney Women's Liberation Collection
  Earthworks Poster Collective silkscreen posters, 1974-1980, at the State Library of New South Wales

Australian artist groups and collectives